Alexandra Ana Maria Agiurgiuculese (born 15 January 2001) is a Romanian-Italian individual rhythmic gymnast who represents Italy. She is a World Championships silver and bronze medalist, and competed at the 2020 Olympic Games. She is the first Italian gymnast to win the Longines Prize for Elegance. She is a four-time medalist at the 2016 European Junior Championships. At the national level, she is the 2019 Italian National All-around champion, three-time (2017, 2018, 2020) Italian National All-around silver medalist.

Personal life
Agiurgiuculese was born in Iași, Romania. She has a brother, Sebastian Constantin, and a sister, Madalina. Her mother is Romanian while her father is of half-Italian, half-Slovene descent. Her father worked at a factory in Italy and sent money to the family in Romania. Her mother and brothers later joined him. She lived in Romania from ages 8 to 10 with her grandparents and trained with the Romanian National rhythmic gymnastics team. She moved to Martignacco, where she attended middle school and later lived first with her coach, Spela Dragas, in Udine for 4 years. She speaks Romanian, Italian, and English.

She joined the Aeronautica Militare at 17 and is a first airman as of 2020. She lived in Udine, until she moved to Desio in late 2021.

Career

Junior 

Representing Romania, Agiurgiuculese won the national competitions in Romania and competed in numerous international events such as at the 2011 Irina Delanu Cup and 2010 Miss Valentine Cup.

In 2012, Agiurgiuculese began to represent Italy. She won the junior national championships in 2012, 2013 and 2015. At the 2014 MTM Ljubljana, she won gold in ball and silver in hoop, clubs, and ribbon. She also competed at the Italian Serie A. She competed at the 2015 Moscow Junior Grand Prix, finishing 8th in the all-around. She won the all-around gold at the 2015 MTM Cup in Ljubljana.

Agiurgiuculese competed at the 2016 Lisboa Junior World Cup, taking bronze in ball, and finished 8th in rope, 7th in hoop, and 4th in clubs. She won silver in rope, and bronze in hoop and ball at the 2016 Pesaro Junior World Cup. At the 2016 Sofia Junior World Cup, Italy won the team bronze, and Agiurgiuculese took silver in ball and finished 4th in clubs. At the 2016 European Junior Championships, Italy won team bronze, and Agiurgiuculese qualified to all apparatus finals. She won silver in ball and clubs, and bronze in rope, and finished 4th in hoop.

Senior 

In 2017 season, Agiurgiuculese made her senior international debut at the 2017 Grand Prix Moscow finishing 8th in the all-around, she qualified to all the apparatus finals placing 5th in clubs, 6th in hoop, 7th in ball and 8th in ribbon. She competed at the 2017 Pesaro World Cup and finished 13th all-around and qualified to two apparatus finals, where she won bronze with ribbon and placed 4th with ball. On 5–7 May Agiurgiuculese competed at the 2017 Sofia World Cup finishing 13th in the all-around, she qualified in 2 apparatus finals where she won a silver medal in ball and finished 8th in ribbon. On 19–21 May Agiurgiuculese along with teammates Milena Baldassarri and Alessia Russo represented the individual seniors for Italy at the 2017 European Championships, she qualified in the ball finals finishing in last place. Agiurgiuculese won silver in the all-around at the Italian National Championships behind Veronica Bertolini. On 7–9 July Agiurgiuculese finished just out of the medals placing 4th in the all-around at the 2017 Berlin World Challenge Cup, she qualified in 3 apparatus final taking a silver medal in hoop, placed 5th in ball and 4th in ribbon. On 5–7 August Agiurgiuculese finished 7th in the all-around behind Bulgaria's Katrin Taseva at the 2017 Minsk World Challenge Cup, she qualified in 3 apparatus finals and won bronze in ball, finished 6th in hoop and 8th in clubs. On 11–13 August  Agiurgiuculese competed at the 2017 Kazan World Challenge Cup finishing 10th in the all-around, she qualified in 3 apparatus finals and finished 8th in hoop, 5th in ball, 6th in clubs.

Together with Milena Baldassarri, Agiurgiuculese represented as individual gymnasts for Italy at the 2017 World Rhythmic Gymnastics Championships in Pesaro, where she finished 8th In the All-around behind Neviana Vladinova, she also qualified in three apparatus finals and finished 7th in ball, 5th in clubs and 4th in ribbon. Agiurgiuculese was awarded with Longines Prize for Elegance at the games, becoming the first Italian gymnast to win the award.

In 2018, she started her season competing at the MTM Ljubljana tournament where she finished 4th in the all-around behind Julia Evchik. On 13–15 April Agiurgiuculese competed at the 2018 Pesaro World Cup, finishing in a disappointing 17th position. On 27–29 April Agiurgiuculese then competed at the 2018 Baku World Cup where she finished 16th in the all-around. On 4–6 May she then competed at the 2018 Guadalajara World Challenge Cup finishing 8th in the all-around, she qualified in 2 apparatus finals finishing 5th in clubs and 8th in ribbon. On 15–17 May Agiurgiuculese competed at the Holon Senior International tournament where she won gold in the all-around with a total of 66.300 points. On 29–30 June she competed at the 2018 Mediterranean Games in Tarragona, Spain, where she won gold All Around medal with a total of 71.150 points.

At the 2018 World Championships Alexandra won a historic bronze medal in the ball final with the score of 19.900. Her bronze medal was the first individual medal for Italy in 27 years at the World Championships.

In 2019, Agiurgiuculese represented Italy together with Milena Baldassarri, Alessia Russo and Sofia Maffeis at the 2019 World Championships in Baku, Azerbaijan, who placed 4th in Team competition. Alexandra then placed 7th in All-Around Qualifications and qualified to Hoop and Clubs finals. In All-around Final, she ended on 6th place and secured Italy an Olympic spot for the 2020 Summer Olympics in Tokyo, Japan. She also placed 6th in Hoop final and 5th in Clubs final. During her ball exercise at the 2019 World Championships, she performed an original body difficulty element, which was given a 0.5 point difficulty value and named "The Agiurguiculese" after her.

In 2021, she started her season competing at the FIG Ritam Cup in Belgrade, Serbia, where she finished 1st in the all-around. On 7–9 May she then competed at the 2021 Baku World Cup finishing 4th in the All-around. At the 2020 Olympic Games, she finished fifteenth in the qualification round for the individual all-around.

In 2022, just after her birthday, it was confirmed, that she left her coach Spela Dragas from ASU Udinese and moved to Desio.

Achievements 
 First Italian individual rhythmic gymnast to win a medal in an individual apparatus final at the FIG World Cup series.
 First Italian individual rhythmic gymnast to win a medal in an individual All-around at the FIG World Cup series.
 First Italian individual rhythmic gymnast to win a gold medal in an individual apparatus final at the FIG World Cup series.
 First Italian individual rhythmic gymnast to win a medal in an individual apparatus final at the World Championships.
 First to perform the original body difficulty element, a turning split leap with ring of the back leg and take off and landing on the same leg, named "The Agiurguiculese" or "The Ag."

Routine music information

Competitive highlights

(Team competitions in seniors are held only at the World Championships, Europeans and other Continental Games.)

References

External links
 
 
 
 

Italian rhythmic gymnasts
Romanian rhythmic gymnasts
2001 births
Living people
Romanian emigrants to Italy
Italian people of Romanian descent
Mediterranean Games gold medalists for Italy
Mediterranean Games medalists in gymnastics
Competitors at the 2018 Mediterranean Games
European Games competitors for Italy
Gymnasts at the 2019 European Games
Medalists at the Rhythmic Gymnastics World Championships
Olympic gymnasts of Italy
Gymnasts at the 2020 Summer Olympics
Sportspeople from Iași
Italian people of Slovene descent